The 1988–89 Arizona Wildcats men's basketball team represented the University of Arizona. The head coach was Lute Olson. The team played its home games in the McKale Center in Tucson, Arizona, and was a member of the Pacific-10 Conference. In the Pac-10 Basketball Tournament, Arizona beat Stanford by a score of 73–51 to claim its second consecutive Pac-10 title.

Roster

Schedule and results

|-
!colspan=9 style=| Regular season

|-
!colspan=9 style=| Pac-10 Tournament

|-
!colspan=9 style=| NCAA Tournament

NCAA basketball tournament
Seeding in brackets
West
Arizona (1) 94, Robert Morris (16) 60
Arizona 94, Clemson (9) 68
UNLV (4) 68, Arizona 67

Rankings

^Coaches did not release a Week 1 poll.

Awards and honors
Sean Elliott, Pacific-10 Player of the Year
Sean Elliott, Pacific-10 Conference men's basketball tournament Most Valuable Player
Sean Elliott, Adolph Rupp Trophy
Sean Elliott, Associated Press College Basketball Player of the Year
Sean Elliott, John R. Wooden Award
Sean Elliott, State Farm Division I Player of the Year Award

Team players drafted into the NBA

References

Arizona
Arizona Wildcats men's basketball seasons
Pac-12 Conference men's basketball tournament championship seasons
Arizona
Arizona Wildcats men's basketball team
Arizona Wildcats men's basketball team